Pete Namlook (born 25 November 1960 as Peter Kuhlmann  in Frankfurt, West Germany, died on 8 November 2012) was an ambient and electronic music producer and composer. In 1992, he founded the German record label FAX +49-69/450464, which he oversaw. He was inspired by the music of Eberhard Weber, Miles Davis, Antonio Carlos Jobim, Chopin, Wendy Carlos, Tangerine Dream and Pink Floyd, and most importantly Klaus Schulze. 

Pete Namlook released many solo albums, as well as collaboration albums with notable artists such as Klaus Schulze, Bill Laswell, Geir Jenssen (Biosphere), Gaudi, Richie Hawtin, Tetsu Inoue, Uwe Schmidt (Atom™), Amir Abadi (Dr. Atmo), and David Moufang (Move D).

By August 2005, Namlook and collaborators had released 135 albums (excluding re-releases, vinyl singles, compilations of existing material, and FAX releases beginning with PS, in which he personally was not involved in the music making).

"Namlook" is "Koolman", a phonetic rendering of his real name, spelled backwards.

Kuhlmann died on 8 November 2012 after suffering a heart attack.

Projects 
These are all of Namlook's project series on the FAX label, with the number of albums in each series. For one-shot albums, the title is given without a number after it.

(Note: These are only the CD releases. Vinyl singles and EPs are not included. There are no full-length LPs on FAX.)

Solo
 4Voice (3 releases; 4Voice with Maik Maurice as "arrangement assistant" on two tracks; 4Voice III with Marc Romboy on one track)
 Air (5 releases)
 Atom
 Electronic Music Center
 Music for Ballet
 Namlook (25 releases)
 Season's Greetings (4 releases; 1 compilation titled The Four Seasons)
 Silence (3 releases of 5 total; first two are with Dr. Atmo)
 Syn (2 releases)
 Music for Babies

with Dr. Atmo
 Escape
 Silence (2 releases of 5 total; latter three are Namlook solo)

with Atom Heart
 Jet Chamber (5 releases)

with Karl Berger
 Polytime

with Dandy Jack
 Amp (2 releases)
 Silent Music

with Gaudi
 Re:sonate

with DJ Brainwave
 Limelight

with DJ Criss
 Deltraxx
 Sequential (one track is Namlook with Tetsu Inoue, not DJ Criss)

with DJ Dag
 Adlernebel

with Pascal F.E.O.S.
 Hearts of Space
 Minimalistic Source

with Rob Gordon
 Ozoona

with Robert Görl
 Elektro (2 releases)

with Richie Hawtin
 From Within (3 releases)

with Hubertus Held
 Pete Namlook/Hubertus Held

with Higher Intelligence Agency
 S.H.A.D.O (2 releases)

with Tetsu Inoue
 62 Eulengasse
 2350 Broadway (4 releases)
 Sequential (only one track)
 Shades of Orion (3 releases)
 Time²

with Geir Jenssen
 The Fires of Ork (2 releases)

with Bill Laswell
 The Dark Side of the Moog (4 releases of 11 total also with Klaus Schulze; other seven are only Namlook and Schulze)
 Outland Series: 1, 2, 3, IV, 5
 Psychonavigation Series: 1, 2, 3, 4, 5

with Mixmaster Morris
 Dreamfish (2 releases)

with David Moufang
 Koolfang (3 releases)
 Move D / Namlook (23 releases)

with New Composers
 Planetarium (2 releases)
 Russian Spring

with Burhan Öçal
 Sultan (3 releases)

with Jochem Paap
 pp-nmlk

with Peter Prochir
 Miles Apart
 Possible Gardens

with Ludwig Rehberg
 The Putney (2 releases)

with Robert Sattler
 Kooler

with Klaus Schulze
 The Dark Side of the Moog (11 releases)

with Jonah Sharp
 Alien Community (2 releases)
 Wechselspannung (2 releases)

with Wolfram Spyra
 Virtual Vices (6 releases)

with Steve Stoll
 Hemisphere

with Charles Uzzell-Edwards
 A New Consciousness (2 releases)
 Create (2 releases)

with Lorenzo Montanà
 Labyrinth (5 releases)

Yesterday & Tomorrow
This was a short-lived sub-label of FAX that was created to showcase a more classical side of ambient music. On these releases he goes by Peter Kuhlmann, his real name, rather than Pete Namlook.

 Passion, with Jürgen Rehberg
 Wandering Soul, with Alban Gerhardt
 The Sunken Road, with Jürgen Rehberg and Lucia Mense

See also 
List of ambient music artists

References

External links
 
 
 Discography of his FAX recordings

 

 

Ambient musicians
German electronic musicians
1960 births
2012 deaths
20th-century German musicians